The Alvear Tower is a residential and hotel skyscraper on Azucena Villaflor Avenue, east of Dock Two in the upscale Puerto Madero section of Buenos Aires. The skyscraper is the tallest building in Argentina.

A mixed-use development, the 54-story,  building includes 175 condominiums totalling , as well as a five star hotel.

Construction
Development took place on a  lot sold by Grupo Château (the local builders of the neighboring Château Puerto Madero Residence) for US$35 million to Madrid-based developer Rayet for the construction of the Hotel Único Buenos Aires. Originally scheduled to open at the end of 2010, the Hotel Único project was canceled. Rayet sold the lot to Anglo-Argentine developer, David Sutton, the proprietor of the Alvear Palace Hotel, on 5 March 2010.

The construction of the Alvear Tower started in March 2012 and was completed in 2017. The skyscraper is budgeted at US$130 million.

See also
List of tallest buildings in Argentina
List of tallest buildings in South America

References

Hotels in Buenos Aires
Mixed-use developments in Argentina
Residential skyscrapers in Argentina
Skyscraper hotels